Douglas John Skaff Jr. is an American politician from the state of West Virginia. A member of the Democratic Party, Skaff serves as a member of the West Virginia House of Delegates, representing the 35th district.

Early life and education 
Skaff was born on November 10, 1976 in Charleston, West Virginia. He was raised in South Charleston, and earned a Bachelor of Science in Marketing from West Virginia University in 2000, followed by a master's degree in Labor and Industrial Relations, also from West Virginia University.

Career 
Skaff was first elected to the West Virginia House of Delegates in 2008 and served three terms. Skaff opted not to seek re-election to the House of Delegates in 2014, instead running to represent the 17th district in the West Virginia Senate. He was defeated by Republican Tom Takubo, and succeeded in the House of Delegates by Andrew Byrd. In the 2018 election, Skaff was re-elected to his old seat in the House of Delegates.

In 2020, Skaff became president of HD Media.

References

1976 births
21st-century American politicians
Living people
People from Wood County, West Virginia
Democratic Party members of the West Virginia House of Delegates